Stefano Bianco (27 October 1985 – 11 March 2020) was an Italian motorcycle racer. At international level, he competed in the 125cc World Championship, the 250cc World Championship and the European Superstock 1000 Championship.

Bianco died on 11 March 2020, in a road traffic accident.

Career statistics

Grand Prix motorcycle racing

By season

Races by year
(key) (Races in bold indicate pole position, races in italics indicate fastest lap)

References

External links
 Profile on MotoGP.com
 Profile on WorldSBK.com

1985 births
2020 deaths
Italian motorcycle racers
125cc World Championship riders
250cc World Championship riders
FIM Superstock 1000 Cup riders
People from Chivasso
Road incident deaths in Italy
Sportspeople from the Metropolitan City of Turin